Ludwig VIII may refer to:

 Louis VIII, Duke of Bavaria (1403–1445)
 Louis VIII, Landgrave of Hesse-Darmstadt (1691–1768)